A krai or kray (kraya) is one of the types of federal subjects of modern Russia, and was a type of geographical administrative division in the Russian Empire and the Russian SFSR.

Etymologically, the word is related to the verb "" (kroit'), "to cut". Historically, krais were vast territories located along the periphery of the Russian state, since the word krai also means border or edge, i.e., a place of the cut-off. In English the term is often translated as "territory". , the administrative usage of the term is mostly traditional, as some oblasts also fit this description and there is no difference in constitutional legal status in Russia between the krais and the oblasts.

See also
 Krais of the Russian Empire
 Krais of Russia
 Governorate-General (Russian Empire), a general term for Krais, Oblasts, and special city municipalities in the Russian Empire
Oblast
Foreign terms (in relation to the Russian "Krai") with similar designation
Kraj, an equivalent term used in the Czech Republic and Slovakia
Krajina
Marches (Mark, in German) compare to Denmark (literally the borderland of Danes).
Name of Ukraine

References

Types of administrative division
Political divisions of Russia
Russian-language designations of territorial entities